The 201st Field Artillery Regiment ("First West Virginia") is a West Virginia Army National Guard regiment. It currently perpetuates the Virginia elements of the Maryland and Virginia Rifle Regiment, which fought in the American Revolution. Organized by Colonel Morgan Morgan in Bunker Hill, West Virginia in 1735, it is the oldest continually-active regiment in the U.S. Army and the oldest in the West Virginia Army National Guard. Units also saw action on both sides of the American Civil War, with many companies of the regiment combined to form the Union Army's 1st West Virginia Infantry.

Headquartered in Fairmont, West Virginia, the 201st Field Artillery employs the M109A6 Paladin self-propelled howitzer, and is part of the 197th Field Artillery Brigade, which is part of the New Hampshire Army National Guard.

History

World War II
On 6 January 1941 the 201st was inducted into federal service at Morgantown, West Virginia, and moved to Fort Benjamin Harrison, Indiana, on 10 January 1941 where it was attached to the Second Army. The regiment staged at Camp Murray, Washington, on 5 August 1941 until it departed the Seattle port of embarkation on 12 September 1941, arriving at Kodiak, Alaska, on 16 September 1941. The 201st transferred to Adak Island in November 1942 and to Amchitka in January 1943 before departing Alaska on 22 March 1944 and returning to the Seattle port of embarkation on 2 April 1944. The regiment moved to Camp Carson, Colorado on 10 April 1944 under the XVI Corps, and was reassigned to the XXXVI Corps on 17 July 1944. Beginning in April 1944, the regiment provided an accelerated six-week course of infantry training (four weeks of familiarization, qualification, and transition firing, and two weeks of tactical training) to men who were formerly members of disbanded anti-aircraft and tank destroyer units or who had volunteered for transfer to the infantry from other branches of the Army. It relocated to Fort Jackson, South Carolina, on 10 September 1944 under IX Corps and was assigned to XXIII Corps on 25 September 1944. It arrived at Camp Rucker (now Fort Rucker), Alabama, on 3 March 1945 under the Replacement & School Command and was inactivated there on 26 September 1945.

Following the war’s end the 201st reverted to state control where it was reorganized and redesignated as the 201st Field Artillery Battalion.

Gulf War
In December 1990, the unit was called to serve in Operation Desert Storm. The unit was activated for 180 days unless sooner released or later extended. The 201st left Fairmont and went to Fort Campbell, Kentucky for training. It joined XVIII Corps Artillery, 18th Field Artillery Brigade. On the exact 256th anniversary of its founding, the unit fired 256 rounds downrange at Iraqi forces. David Tucker was a chaplain's assistant of the unit at the time and noted this in a letter to The Fairmont Times.

The units of the 201st returned to their home base in May, 1991. The "First West Virginia" did not lose a single man during the war.

Iraq War
In December 2003, the 201st was again called to active duty for Operation Iraqi Freedom. The soldiers trained at Fort Drum, New York in January and February, 2004 before going overseas. While in theater, the battalion was subordinated to the 197th Fires Brigade of the New Hampshire National Guard and commanded by Colonel James Guise. The 197th reported directly to III Corps Artillery, under the command of Brigadier General Richard Formica. The unit spent one year in Iraq before returning home in February 2005. B Battery and Service Battery were co-located with the HHB. A Battery operated out of Convoy Support Center (CSC) Scania and C Battery operated out of CSC Navistar in Kuwait. The Battalion's mission was convoy security and route clearance for Main Supply Route (MSR) Tampa, the primary route for supplies in Iraq at the time. C Battery would later move north to Camp Cedar II and Tallil Airbase and continue convoy security. Some members of C Battery were also attached to the 1st Cav Division in Jan 2005 to provide extra security in Baghdad (they were stationed in the Hotel District: the Baghdad, Palestine and Sheraton Hotels across the river from the Green Zone) for the first elections while the rest of the unit and battalion trained their replacements.

Current organization
Today, 1st Battalion, 201st Field Artillery Regiment is the only active squadron in the regiment. Battery A, B, and C each field the M109A6 Paladin, a self-propelled howitzer utilizing a 155mm main cannon. The "First West Virginia" is also complemented by two detachments from the 1201st Forward Support Company, which are attached to the regiment.

Headquarters 1-201st Field Artillery: Fairmont, West Virginia
A Battery: Belington, West Virginia
B Battery: Morgantown, West Virginia
C Battery: Maxwelton, West Virginia
Detachment 3, 1201st Forward Support Company: Morgantown, West Virginia
Detachment 5, 1201st Forward Support Company: Maxwelton, West Virginia

Distinctive unit insignia
 Description: A Gold colored metal and enamel device 1 inch (2.54 cm) in height consisting of a shield blazoned: Or, a saltire per saltire Azure and Gray per cross counterchanged between in chief a rattlesnake coiled to strike Vert and in fess a sheathed Roman sword and a fleur-de-lis Gules, on a chief Azure two lions combatant of the first. Attached below the shield is a Gold scroll inscribed "YES SIR" in Blue letters.
 Symbolism: The chief is blue for Infantry. The two lions represent the Revolutionary War and the War of 1812. The saltire counterchanged denotes Civil War service in both the Union and Confederate armies. The snake alludes to Mexican–American War service. The Roman sword is indicative of Spanish War service and the fleur-de-lis refers to service in France during World War I.
 Background: The distinctive unit insignia was originally approved for the 201st Infantry Regiment on 20 November 1929. It was redesignated for the 201st Armored Field Artillery Battalion on 20 July 1953. It was redesignated for the 201st Artillery Regiment on 18 July 1960. The insignia was redesignated for the 201st Field Artillery Regiment on 19 July 1972.

Coat of arms
Blazon:
 Shield: Or, a saltire per saltire Azure and Gray per cross counterchanged between in chief a rattlesnake coiled to strike Vert and in fess a sheathed Roman sword and a fleur-de-lis Gules, on a chief Azure two lions combatant of the first.
 Crest: That for the regiments and separate battalions of the West Virginia Army National Guard: On a wreath of the colors Or and Azure, a slip of mountain rhododendron in full bloom and leaved Proper.
 Motto: YES SIR.
Symbolism:
 Shield: The chief is blue for Infantry. The two lions represent the Revolutionary War and the War of 1812. The saltire counterchanged denotes Civil War service in both the Confederate and Federal armies.  The snake alludes to Mexican–American War service. The Roman sword is indicative of Spanish War service and the fleur-de-lis refers to service in France during World War I.
 Crest: The crest is that of the West Virginia Army National Guard.
Background: The coat of arms was originally approved for the 201st Infantry Regiment on 21 November 1929. It was redesignated for the 201st Armored Field Artillery Battalion on 20 July 1953. It was redesignated for the 201st Artillery Regiment on 18 July 1960. The insignia was redesignated for the 201st Field Artillery Regiment on 19 July 1972.

Notes

References
 Lineage and honors certificate, 201st Field Artillery Regiment (March 12, 2003): United States Army Center of Military History, Fort Lesley J. McNair, Washington, D.C.

201
201
Military units and formations in West Virginia
West Virginia Army National Guard
201
Military units and formations established in 1735